Megasis pupillatella is a species of snout moth in the genus Megasis. It was described by Émile Louis Ragonot in 1887, and is known from Turkmenistan (including Askhabad, the type location).

References

Moths described in 1887
Phycitini